Phillip Joll is a Welsh operatic baritone known for his portrayal of Wotan in Wagner's Der Ring des Nibelungen.

Born 14 March 1954 in Merthyr Tydfil, Joll was a pupil at Cyfarthfa High School, before joining the Royal Northern College of Music. He graduated from the National Opera Studio in London. He appears in a wide variety of roles in the German and Italian repertoire in such roles as Simon Boccanegra, Falstaff, Rigoletto, Tonio in Pagliacci, and Wozzeck.

His Australian debut was as Jochanaan in Richard Strauss' Salome in 1988 for the Lyric Opera of Queensland. He first sang Wotan with the Seattle Opera in 2000.

References

External links

21st-century Welsh male opera singers
Welsh operatic baritones
Living people
1954 births